Claudio Antón de Luzuriaga (1810 in Soto en Cameros, La Rioja, Spain – 1874 in San Sebastián, Spain) was a Spanish lawyer and politician who served as Minister of State in 1854, in a cabinet headed by Baldomero Espartero, 1st Duke of la Victoria. Loyal to the Progressive Party and to Espartero, he declined the offer of the unionist Leopoldo O'Donnell, 1st Duke of Tetuan of becoming Minister of Justice in 1856.

References
www.xtec.es Claudio Antón de Luzuriaga

|-

Foreign ministers of Spain
1810 births
1874 deaths
Progressive Party (Spain) politicians
Presidents of the Supreme Court of Spain